The list of acts of the 115th United States Congress includes all Acts of Congress and ratified treaties by the 115th United States Congress, which began on January 3, 2017, and ended on January 3, 2019.

Acts include public and private laws, which are enacted after being passed by Congress and signed by the President; however, if the President vetoes a bill it can still be enacted by a two-thirds vote in both houses. The Senate alone considers treaties, which are ratified by a two-thirds vote.

The first public law enacted in the 115th Congress was the last law signed by President Barack Obama, and he signed it into law in the Capitol in the last hour of his presidency on January 20, 2017, shortly before the inauguration of his successor. The 115th Congress enacted 442 statutes and ratified 6 treaties.

Public laws

Private laws

Treaties

See also
 List of bills in the 115th United States Congress
 List of United States presidential vetoes#Donald Trump
 List of United States federal legislation
 List of acts of the 114th United States Congress
 Lists of acts of the United States Congress

References

External links

 Authenticated Public and Private Laws from the Federal Digital System
 Legislation & Records Home: Treaties from the Senate
 Public Laws for the 115th Congress at Congress.gov
 Private Laws for the 115th Congress at Congress.gov

115
 
2017-related lists
2018-related lists